Tennis events were contested at the 2009 Summer Universiade in Belgrade, Serbia.

Events

Medal table

See also
 Tennis at the Summer Universiade

References

2009
Summer Universiade
2009 Summer Universiade